Mário “Marito” Correia (born March 17, 1978 in Praia, Cape Verde) is a Cape Verdean professional basketball player. He played for Primeiro de Agosto at the Angolan Basketball League until 2014, before being struck by injury. Correia’s early introduction to basketball started in the District Sports Association Kwame Nkrumah abbreviated to ADESBA-KN.  Correia is currently the captain of the Cape Verde national basketball team and helped Cape Verde to a bronze medal at the FIBA Africa Championship 2007, qualifying for a wildcard tournament for the 2008 Summer Olympics.

Collegiate career
Correia attended and played basketball with then-Division II Bryant University from 2002–2005.  After the 2004–05 season, Correia was named All-Northeast 10 Conference third team after a successful season in which he averaged 13.5 PPG for the Bulldogs.
Mario also played the  2001–2002  season at Massasoit Community College where he was named All-New England.

Professional career
After graduating from Bryant, Correia signed with Maia Basket of the Portuguese Proliga.

International career
Correia played his first international game at The FIBA Africa Championship 1997 in Dakar, Senegal. Today Correia is captain of the Cape Verde national basketball team.  At the FIBA Africa Championship 2007, he averaged 11.3 PPG and 3.8 RPG to help the Cape Verdeans to a surprise bronze medal.  Although the team struggled to a 13th place in the 2009 FIBA Africa Championship, Correia turned in another solid performance, averaging 15.2 PPG, 3.6 RPG, and 2.4 APG over five games.

References

1978 births
Living people
Bryant Bulldogs men's basketball players
Atlético Sport Aviação basketball players
C.D. Primeiro de Agosto men's basketball players
Cape Verdean men's basketball players
Junior college men's basketball players in the United States
Power forwards (basketball)
Small forwards
Cape Verdean expatriate basketball people in Angola
Cape Verdean expatriate basketball people in the United States
Sportspeople from Praia
AD Bairro basketball players
Cape Verdean expatriate basketball people in Portugal